Robert E. Millette served as Ambassador of Grenada to the United Nations from 1995 to 1998. During his tenure, Millette assisted the prime minister and the Ministry of Foreign Affairs in raising millions of dollars for infrastructural projects such as the stadium and the Ministerial complex.

Since returning to academia in 1998, Millette has been conducting research in areas such as Public Sector Reform, the United Nations, and leadership and shared governance at Historically Black Colleges and Universities (HBCU). Robert E. Millette, Professor of Sociology, has been teaching sociology at Lincoln University (Pennsylvania) since 1984. In addition to teaching,  Millette serves as Director of the Global Studies Institute. Millette authored books on Black families.

References

Official Website of the Government of Grenada

Living people
Year of birth missing (living people)
Permanent Representatives of Grenada to the United Nations
Lincoln University (Pennsylvania) faculty